The Fuji FA-200 Aero Subaru is a single-engine piston-powered monoplane built by Fuji Heavy Industries of Japan.

Design and development
Fuji Heavy Industries began development of a four-seat light aeroplane, the Fuji FA-200 Aero Subaru in 1964, the first prototype flying on 12 August 1965.  It is a low-wing all-metal aircraft, fitted with a fixed nosewheel undercarriage and a sliding canopy.  It was first certified in Japan on 6 July 1966, with certification in the United States occurring on 26 September 1967.

Production started in March 1968, continuing until 1986, with a total of 275 built.

Variants
F-200-II
Prototype with a  Lycoming O-320 engine
FA-200-160 Initial version, powered by 120 kW Lycoming O-320 engine and fixed-pitch propeller.
FA-200-180 More powerful development -  Lycoming IO-360 engine and constant speed propeller.
FA-200-180AO Powered by 130 kW Lycoming IO-320 engine and fitted with fixed-pitch propeller.
FA-203-S Experimental short takeoff and landing (STOL) version, developed by Japan's National Aerospace Laboratory fitted with boundary layer control system.
F-201
Proposed three-seat variant, not built.
F-202
Proposed two-seat aerobatic variant, not built.
F-203
Proposed STOL variant.
F-204
Proposed crop spraying variant, not built.

Accidents and incidents
On May 13, 2017, a Fuji FM 200-160 with tail number E7-AAS, crashed in Jasenica, near Mostar in Bosnia and Herzegovina, killing all 5 on board. Among them were 3 children.

Specifications (FA-200-180)

See also

References

External links

 FUJI/FA-200 AERO SUBARU 

Subaru
FA-200
1960s Japanese civil utility aircraft
Single-engined tractor aircraft
Low-wing aircraft
Aircraft first flown in 1965